Lesica may refer to the following places in Poland:
Lesica, Lower Silesian Voivodeship (south-west Poland)
Lesica, Świętokrzyskie Voivodeship (south-central Poland)

See also
Lisica (disambiguation)